Rivarolo Canavese railway station serves the town and comune of Rivarolo Canavese, in the Piedmont region, northwestern Italy.

Since 2012 it serves line SFM1, part of the Turin metropolitan railway service.

Services

References

Railway stations in the Metropolitan City of Turin
Railway stations opened in 1866
1866 establishments in Italy
Railway stations in Italy opened in the 19th century